Woodmans is an unincorporated community in Jefferson County, in the U.S. state of Washington.

The community was named after James O. Woodman, an early settler.

References

Unincorporated communities in Jefferson County, Washington
Unincorporated communities in Washington (state)